Tegguiada In Tessoum is a town in Agadez Region, Arlit Department, Niger. Its largely season population is based in the nearby town of Ingall who oversee a historic salt producing industry.

References

Populated places in Niger
Agadez Region